Senator Hertel may refer to:

Curtis Hertel Jr. (born 1978), Michigan state senator
John C. Hertel (born 1946), Michigan State Senate